Mar Aba may refer to:

 Aba, one of the martyr companions of Abda and Abdisho in 376
 Aba I, patriarch of the Church of the East from 540 to 552
 Aba Qozma, coadjutor of the Church of the East together with Babai the Great from 609 to 628
 Aba II, patriarch of the Church of the East from 741 to 751